Toboggan may refer to:

Toboggan, a sled
Toboggan (BMX trick)
Toboggan (Lakemont Park), a roller coaster
Toboggan Handicap, a Thoroughbred horse race
Toboggan (horse), a Thoroughbred racehorse
Knit cap, called a "toboggan" in some regional dialects of the United States
Tabagan, a ski resort located in Almaty, Kazakhstan
Water slide, called a "toboggan" in some languages